This was a new event in 2012.

Hsieh Su-wei won the title defeating Duan Yingying in the final 6–2, 6–2.

Seeds

Main draw

Finals

Top half

Bottom half

References
 Main Draw
 Qualifying Draw

ITF Women's Circuit - Suzhou - Singles
Suzhou Ladies Open